St. Martinus University Faculty of Medicine (SMUFOM) is a private medical school located in Willemstad, Curaçao, which started operating in 2003.

In October 2005, the school had half the number of students it needed to break even, and in October 2007, Banco de Caribe announced an auction of the university property. Education of students never halted and the auction never actually manifested. In 2010, SMU came under the administration of Priyamvada Sharma.

In 2013 the university became a designated educational institution for the Canada Student Loans Program.

Third-year medical students do clerkships at Pontiac General Hospital, in Pontiac, Michigan.

St. Martinus University is listed in the World Directory of Medical Schools, and its graduates are eligible to apply for ECFMG certification, allowing them to take the United States Medical Licensing Examination and become licensed to practice medicine in the US. It is recognized by the Medical Council of India as a degree-granting university/institution. It is not accredited by the Caribbean Accreditation Authority for Education in Medicine and other Health Professions, Accreditation Commission of Colleges of Medicine, or Accreditation Organisation of the Netherlands and Flanders.

See also 
 International medical graduate
 List of medical schools in the Caribbean

References

External links

Educational institutions established in 2000
Schools of medicine in Curaçao
Willemstad
2000 establishments in the Netherlands Antilles